Also People is a 1959 Soviet short film directed by Georgiy Daneliya. based on scene of War and Peace by Leo Tolstoi.

Plot 
The film takes place during the war of 1812, when Napoleon’s army is defeated and retreats. In the center of the plot are three Russian soldiers who are stationed in the forest.

Zaletaev brags that he "took Poleon twice prisoner". Senior soldiers laugh and go to bed. Suddenly, two cold, hungry, barefoot French soldiers come out from behind the bushes, straying from their unit. One of them falls in exhaustion. Russians carried him to the Colonel. Then they treat the second Frenchman porridge and poured him vodka. Warmed up, half-asleep Frenchman humming a song, Zaletaev echoes him. A French soldier falls asleep in his lap. "Also people!" an old soldier exclaims.

Cast 
 Lev Durov	as Zaletayev, young soldier
 Yevgeni Kudryashov as middleaged soldier
 Vsevolod Sanaev as old soldier
 Manos Zacharias as french officer 
 Vladimir Ferapontov as french officer

References

External links 
 

1959 films
1950s Russian-language films
Soviet drama films
1959 drama films